Braunite is a silicate mineral containing both di- and tri-valent manganese with the chemical formula:
Mn2+Mn3+6[O8|SiO4]. Common impurities include iron, calcium, boron, barium, titanium, aluminium, and magnesium.

Braunite forms grey/black tetragonal crystals and has a Mohs hardness of 6 - 6.5.

It was named after the Wilhelm von Braun (1790–1872) of Gotha, Thuringia, Germany.

A calcium iron bearing variant, named braunite II (formula: Ca(Mn3+,Fe3+)14SiO24), was discovered and described in 1967 from Kalahari, Cape Province, South Africa.

References

External links
Webmineral
Athena mineral

Manganese(II,III) minerals
Nesosilicates
Tetragonal minerals
Minerals in space group 142
Oxide minerals